Goulais can refer to:

Places, all in Ontario, Canada:
Goulais Bay
Goulais River
Goulais Bay 15A, a First Nations reserve in Algoma District
Goulais Bay 15C, a former First Nation reserve within Prince Township
Goulais and District, a local services board

People:
, French screenwriter and theatre director